Guychmyrat Dovletgeldiyevich Annaguliyev or Güýçmyrat Döwletgeldiýewiç Annagulyýew (born 10 June 1996) is a Turkmen professional footballer who plays as defender for Turkmen club Ahal and the Turkmenistan national team.

Club career 
Annagulyýew joined FC Altyn Asyr in April 2021.

International career 
Annagulyýew made his senior debut for Turkmenistan against Afghanistan, where he also scored his first international goal. He was included in Turkmenistan's squad for the 2019 AFC Asian Cup in the United Arab Emirates.

Career statistics

International
Statistics accurate as of match played 9 June 2021

International goals
Scores and results list Turkmenistan's goal tally first.

References

External links 
 
 

1996 births
Living people
Turkmenistan footballers
Association football defenders
Turkmenistan international footballers
FC Ahal players
2019 AFC Asian Cup players